This is a list of the people who have been the official Australian captains in Tests, ODIs and Twenty20 Internationals cricket teams.

Australia participated in the first Test match in cricket in 1877, the first One Day International in 1971 (both against England) and the first Twenty20 international in 2005 (against New Zealand). In addition to officially sanctioned international matches and tours organised by the Australian Cricket Board (now known as Cricket Australia), there have been two major rebel Australian sides. In the 1970s many of Australia's leading players signed up for Kerry Packer's World Series Cricket and played in a number of SuperTests against other international sides. Then in the mid-1980s there were two rebel Australian tours to South Africa, which was at that time banned from official competition because of the apartheid regime then in force there. The captains of those Australian sides are also listed below.

Men's cricket

Test match captains

This is a list of cricketers who have captained the Australian cricket team for at least one Test match (not including vice-captains and other players who have deputised on the field for any period of time during a match where the captain has been unable to play). Where a player has a dagger (†) next to a Test match series in which he captained at least one Test, that denotes that player deputised for the appointed captain or were appointed by the home authority for a minor proportion in a series. The dagger classification follows that adopted by Wisden Cricketers' Almanack.

The table of results is complete up to the fourth Test against India in March 2023.

Notes:
1 In 1945, just after the Second World War had ended in Europe, Warrant Officer Lindsay Hassett (as he then was) captained the Australian Services in five "Victory Tests" against England. The series was tied two-all with one draw. The "Victory Tests" have not, however, been granted full Test status.
2 Includes one tie
3 In 1971–72, the planned tour to Australia by South Africa was cancelled. A Rest of the World XI toured Australia in its place and played five "Tests". Ian Chappell captained Australia in all of them. The World XI won two "Tests", Australia one, with two being drawn. The matches have retrospectively been denied Test status.
4 Ian Chappell and Greg Chappell are brothers, and grandsons of Vic Richardson.
5 Steve Smith was removed as Australian captain during the third Test of the 2017–18 tour of South Africa due to a ball-tampering scandal. His vice-captain, David Warner was also stood down. Tim Paine acted as Australian captain for the remainder of the Test match. Smith and Warner were subsequently suspended following an investigation, and Paine was confirmed as captain for the Fourth (and final) Test.
6 Pat Cummins was withdrawn from the Test squad after being deemed a close contact of a person who received a positive COVID-19 test. Vice-captain Steve Smith acted as Australian captain in his place.

Test match vice-captains

A number of players have served as vice-captain(s) in the Test side including:
 Bill Woodfull – under Jack Ryder from October 1928 to March 1929, then promoted to captain
 Vic Richardson – under Bill Woodfull from December 1932 to June 1934, when he was unavailable for selection
 Don Bradman – under Bill Woodfull from June to August 1934, when he was unavailable for selection
 Stan McCabe – under Vic Richardson from August 1934 to December 1936
 Stan McCabe – retained the position under Don Bradman from December 1936 to August 1938, when he retired
 Lindsay Hassett – under Don Bradman from November 1946 to August 1948, then promoted to captain
 Arthur Morris – under Lindsay Hassett from December 1949 to November 1954 
 Arthur Morris – retained the position under Ian Johnson from November to December 1954 to March 1955, when he was made to step aside for Keith Miller
 Richie Benaud – under Arthur Morris for one Test in December 1954, when Johnson was injured
 Arthur Morris – resumed the position under Ian Johnson from December 1954 to March 1955, when he was made to step aside for Keith Miller
 Keith Miller – under Ian Johnson from March 1955 to 1956, when he retired
 Neil Harvey – under Ian Craig in 1957–58 vs South Africa
 Neil Harvey – retained the position under Richie Benaud from December 1958 to February 1963, deputised as captain for one Test and later retired
 Bob Simpson – under Richie Benaud for one Test in December 1963, then promoted to captain
 Brian Booth – under Bob Simpson from January 1964 to January 1966, deputised as captain for two Tests and then dropped
 Bill Lawry – under Bob Simpson from January 1966 to January 1968, then promoted to captain
 Barry Jarman – under Bill Lawry from 1968 to January 1969, when he retired
 Ian Chappell – under Bill Lawry from February 1969 to February 1971, then promoted to captain 
 Keith Stackpole – under Ian Chappell from June to August 1972,
 Ian Redpath – under Ian Chappell from December 1972 to October 1975
 Ian Redpath – retained the position under Greg Chappell from October 1975 to February 1976, when he retired
 David Hookes – under Greg Chappell from December 1976 to June 1977, when he was made to step aside for Rod Marsh
 Rod Marsh – under Greg Chappell from June to August 1977, then left to join World Series Cricket
 Craig Serjeant – under Bob Simpson from December 1977 to January 1978, when he was dropped
 Graham Yallop – under Bob Simpson from January to February 1978, when he was dropped
 Jeff Thomson – under Bob Simpson from February to May 1978, then left to join World Series Cricket
 Gary Cosier – under Graham Yallop from November to December 1978, when he was dropped
 John Maclean – under Graham Yallop from December 1978 to January 1979, when he was dropped
 Andrew Hilditch – under Graham Yallop from March to September 1979
 Andrew Hilditch – retained the position under Kim Hughes from September to November 1979, when he was dropped
 Kim Hughes – under Greg Chappell from November 1979 to June 1981, then stood in as captain when Chappell was unavailable for selection
 Rod Marsh – resumed the position under Kim Hughes from June to September 1981, when he was made to step aside for Kim Hughes   
 Kim Hughes – resumed the position under Greg Chappell from November 1981 to March 1982, then stood in as captain when Chappell was unavailable for selection
 Allan Border – under Kim Hughes from March to October 1982, when he was made to step aside for Kim Hughes
 Kim Hughes – resumed the position under Greg Chappell from October 1982 to April 1983, when he was unavailable for selection
 David Hookes – resumed the position under Greg Chappell from April to November 1983, when he was dropped
 Greg Chappell – resumed the position under Kim Hughes from November 1983 to January 1984, when he retired
 Allan Border – resumed the position under Kim Hughes from March to December 1984, then promoted to captain
 Rodney Hogg – under Allan Border in December 1984, when he was injured
 Andrew Hilditch – resumed the position under Allan Border from December 1984 to, when he was made to step aside for Graeme Wood
 Graeme Wood – under Allan Border for one Test in June 1985, when he was made to step aside for Andrew Hilditch
 Andrew Hilditch – resumed the position under Allan Border from June to November 1985, when he was dropped
 David Hookes – under Allan Border from November to December 1985, when he was dropped
 Ray Bright – under Allan Border from January to October 1986, when he was made to step aside for David Boon
 David Boon – under Allan Border from September to December 1986, when he was dropped
 Geoff Marsh – under Allan Border from January 1987 to January 1992, when he was dropped
 Mark Taylor – under Allan Border from February 1992 to April 1994, dropped and injured once respectively, re-selected and later promoted to captain
 Ian Healy – under Mark Taylor from April 1994 to March 1997, when he was sacked from the position
 Steve Waugh – under Mark Taylor from March 1997 to February 1999, then promoted to captain
 Shane Warne – under Steve Waugh from February 1999 to April 1999, when he was dropped
 Mark Waugh – under Steve Waugh for one Test in April 1999, when Shane Warne was dropped
 Shane Warne – resumed the position under Steve Waugh from July 1999 to August 2000, when he was sacked from the position
 Adam Gilchrist – under Steve Waugh from August to December 2000, then stood in as captain when Waugh was injured
 Ricky Ponting – under Adam Gilchrist (when Steve Waugh was injured) for one Test in December 2000
 Adam Gilchrist – resumed the position under Steve Waugh from December 2000 to August 2001, then stood in as captain when Waugh was injured 
 Ricky Ponting – resumed the position under Adam Gilchrist (when Steve Waugh was injured) for one Test in August 2001
 Adam Gilchrist – resumed the position under Steve Waugh from August 2001 to April 2003, when he was made to step aside for Ricky Ponting
 Ricky Ponting – resumed the position under Steve Waugh from April 2003 to March 2004, then promoted to captain
 Adam Gilchrist – resumed the position under Ricky Ponting from March to October 2004, then stood in as captain when Ponting was injured
 Matthew Hayden – under Adam Gilchrist (when Ricky Ponting was injured) for three Tests in October 2004
 Adam Gilchrist – resumed the position under Ricky Ponting from November 2004 to January 2008, when he retired
 Michael Hussey – under Ricky Ponting for one Test in May 2008, when Michael Clarke was injured
 Michael Clarke – under Ricky Ponting from May 2008 to March 2011, then promoted to captain
 Shane Watson – under Michael Clarke, from March 2011 to April 2013, deputised as captain for one Test and later resigned from the position
 Brad Haddin – under Michael Clarke from April 2013 to December 2014
 Brad Haddin – retained the position under Steve Smith (when Michael Clarke was injured) from December 2014 to January 2015, when he was made to step aside for Steve Smith
 Steve Smith – under Michael Clarke from January 2015 to August 2015, then promoted to captain 
 David Warner – under Steve Smith from August 2015 to March 2018, when he stood down following a ball-tampering scandal
 Josh Hazlewood (jointly with Mitchell Marsh) – under Tim Paine from September 2018 to January 2019, when he was injured
 Mitchell Marsh (jointly with Josh Hazlewood) – under Tim Paine from September 2018 to January 2019, when he was dropped
 Travis Head (jointly with Pat Cummins) – under Tim Paine from January 2019 to November 2020, dropped at one point, re-selected and later sacked from the position
 Pat Cummins (jointly with Travis Head until November 2020) – under Tim Paine from January 2019 to November 2021, then promoted to captain
 Steve Smith – resumed the position under Pat Cummins from November to December 2021, then stood in as captain when Cummins was unavailable for selection
 Travis Head – resumed the position under Steve Smith (when Pat Cummins was unavailable) for one Test in December 2021
 Steve Smith – resumed the position under Pat Cummins from December 2021 to December 2022, then stood in as captain when Cummins was injured
 Alex Carey – under Steve Smith (when Pat Cummins was injured) for one Test in December 2022
 Steve Smith – resumed the position under Pat Cummins from December 2022 to March 2023, then stood in as captain when Cummins was unavailable
 Alex Carey – resumed the position under Steve Smith (when Pat Cummins was unavailable) in March 2023

One Day International captains

This is a list of cricketers who have captained the Australia national cricket team for at least one One Day International (ODI).

The table of results is complete up to the third ODI against England in November 2022.

Notes:
Source: 
6Ian Chappell also captained the Australians against a Rest of the World XI in three one-day matches in 1971/2. The series was tied one-all, with one match abandoned without a ball being bowled. These games are not now recognised as official ODIs. 
7Ricky Ponting also captained the ICC World XI in the first ODI played as part of the World Cricket Tsunami Appeal. The ICC World XI won that game.

Twenty20 International captains
Ricky Ponting was Australia's first captain in Twenty20 Internationals. On occasions when Ponting was unavailable, vice-captain Adam Gilchrist filled the role. In December 2007, Ponting was rested from the team to give the younger players exposure. Although vice-captain Gilchrist was in the team, 26-year-old Michael Clarke was selected as captain. Ponting called him the "obvious choice" and Clarke had been predicted to be the next full-time captain of Australia once Ponting stepped down from the captaincy. With Gilchrist's retirement from all forms of representative cricket at the end of the 2007–08 season, Clarke was promoted to the regular vice-captain's position. Thereafter, Cameron White was promoted as the captain, but George Bailey has taken over the captaincy in the two match series against India.

This is a list of cricketers who have captained the Australia national cricket team for at least one Twenty 20 International (T20I). A total of eleven players have captained Australia in T20Is, of which Aaron Finch is the most successful captain, with 35 wins. Australia are currently without a captain following Aaron Finch's retirement, with a announcement to be made prior to their next game, in late 2023.

The table of results is complete up to the T20I against Afghanistan in November 2022.

Notes:
Source:

Other Men's captains
Captains of World Series Cricket teams (during the Packer split) and of the Rebel Australian XI to visit apartheid South Africa in 1985–86 are as follows:

World Series Cricket 1977–78 and 1978–79

Ian Chappell captained the WSC Australians in five Supertests in 1977–78, winning one and losing four. His brother Greg Chappell took over for a sixth Supertest, which the WSC Australians won. In 1978–79 in Australia Ian Chappell captained the WSC Australians in four Supertests, winning one, losing two and drawing the other one. In the same season in the West Indies, Ian Chappell went on to captain in five Supertests, winning one, losing one and drawing three.

South Africa 1985–86 and 1986–87

Kim Hughes captained a Rebel Australian XI to South Africa in 1985–86. He captained his Australian XI in 3 Rebel "Tests", losing one of them and drawing the other two. He also captained in another rebel tour in 1986–87 in 4 Rebel "Tests", losing one of them and drawing the other three.

Women's cricket

Test match captains
This is a list of cricketers who have captained the Australian women's cricket team for at least one women's Test match (not including vice-captains and other players who have deputised on the field for any period of time during a match where the captain has been unable to play). Where a player has a dagger (†) next to a Test match series in which she captained at least one Test, that denotes that player deputised for the appointed captain or were appointed by the home authority for a minor proportion in a series.

The table of results is complete up to 2022.

Women's One-Day International captains

This is a list of cricketers who have captained the Australian women's cricket team for at least one women's One-Day International. Australia won the World Cup in 1977–78, 1981–82, 1988–89, 1997–98 and 2004–05.

The table of results is complete to the third ODI against New Zealand in October 2020.

Women's Twenty20 International captains

This is a list of cricketers who have captained the Australian women's cricket team for at least one women's Twenty20 International.

Youth cricket

Test match captains

This is a list of cricketers who have captained the Australia Under-19 cricket team for at least one match. Where a player has a dagger (†) next to a Test match series in which he captained at least one Test, that denotes that player was captain for a minor proportion in a series.

The table of results is complete to the one Test against Sri Lanka in 2019.

One-Day International captains

This is a list of cricketers who have captained the Australia Under-19 cricket team for at least one Under-19 One Day International. The table of results is complete to the 2012 ICC Under-19 World Cup. Australia won the World Cup in 1987–88 and 2001–02.

See also
List of Australian Test cricketers
List of Australian ODI cricketers
List of Australian Twenty20 International cricketers

References

External links
Cricket Archive list of Australian captains by series 
Cricket Archive list of Australian captains by record 
Cricket Archive list of Australia Captains' Playing Record in ODI Matches 

Captains
Lists of Australian cricketers
Australia